DIN 31635 is a Deutsches Institut für Normung (DIN) standard for the transliteration of the Arabic alphabet adopted in 1982. It is based on the rules of the Deutsche Morgenländische Gesellschaft (DMG) as modified by the International Orientalist Congress 1935 in Rome. Its acceptance relies less on its official status than on its elegance (one sign for each Arabic letter) and the Geschichte der arabischen Literatur manuscript catalogue of Carl Brockelmann and the dictionary of Hans Wehr. Today it is used in most German-language publications of Arabic and Islamic studies.

Table 
The 28 letters:

Rules 
A  results in a geminate (consonant written twice). The article is written with the sun letters assimilated.

The initial  without a  isn't transliterated using  initially, only the initial vowel is transliterated (if pronounced): .

A hyphen  is used to separate clitics (the article, the prepositions and the conjunction) from words to which they are attached.

The Eastern Arabic numerals are rendered as western Arabic numerals.

See also 

 Romanization of Arabic
 ISO 233
 Hans Wehr transliteration
 Arabic phonology
 Help:IPA/Arabic (Wikipedia help)

Notes

References 
  Reprint (Wiesbaden, 1969)

External links 
 Chart of Arabic transliteration systems (non-normative), including DIN 31635, Revision 2.2 (2008-02-25)
 Deutsches Institut für Normung

Romanization of Arabic
31635